The following is a list of Malayalam films released in the year 1973.

References

 1973
1973
Malayalam